John Grey (1873 – June 27, 1933) was an American screenwriter. He wrote for 60 films between 1917 and 1933. Grey was born in San Jose, California and died in Hollywood, California.

Selected filmography
 That's My Meat (1931)
 Chinatown Charlie (1928)
 Speedy (1928)
 The Freshman (1925)
 Crack o' Dawn (1925)
 Super Speed (1925)
 A Self-Made Failure (1924)
 Geared to Go (1924)
 Captain January (1924)
 Fools in the Dark (1924)
 Canyon of the Fools (1923)
 Terror Trail (1921)
 The Mystery Mind (1920)
 The Grim Game (1919)

External links

1873 births
1933 deaths
American male screenwriters
20th-century American male writers
20th-century American screenwriters